Kaş is a Turkish surname. Notable people with the surname include:

 Erkan Kaş (born 1991), Turkish footballer
 İbrahim Kaş (born 1986), Turkish footballer

See also
 Kas (disambiguation)

Turkish-language surnames